Virginia's 30th Senate district is one of 40 districts in the Senate of Virginia. It has been represented by Democrat Adam Ebbin since 2012, succeeding retiring fellow Democrat Patsy Ticer.

Geography
District 30 is located directly on the Potomac River, including most of Alexandria as well as smaller parts of Arlington County and Fairfax County such as Rose Hill, Huntington, Fort Hunt and Mount Vernon.

The district is located entirely within Virginia's 8th congressional district, and overlaps with the 42nd, 43rd, 44th, 45th, 46th, 48th, and 49th districts of the Virginia House of Delegates. The district lies directly across the river from Maryland and the District of Columbia.

Recent election results

2019

2015

2011

Federal and statewide results in District 30

Historical results
All election results below took place prior to 2011 redistricting, and thus were under different district lines.

2007

2003

1999

1995

District officeholders

References

Virginia Senate districts
Alexandria, Virginia
Arlington County, Virginia
Government in Fairfax County, Virginia